The Hamgyong campaign, also known as  Katō Kiyomasa's northern campaign, was Katō Kiyomasa's invasion of the northeastern Korean province of Hamgyeong during the Japanese invasions of Korea (1592–1598). The campaign was largely due to the help of Korean defectors who also handed over to the Japanese their princes Sunhwa and Imhae. The Japanese reached the northeastern edge of Hamgyeong, crossed the Duman River, and attacked the Orangai Jurchens, but met with heavy resistance. Katō returned south and took up residence in Anbyeon while Nabeshima Naoshige headquartered in Gilju. By winter local resistance began pushing back at Japanese occupation and laid siege to Gilju.

Campaign
Katō Kiyomasa and Nabeshima Naoshige invaded Hamgyeong with a force of 20,000 following the taking of Gaeseong.

Both the South Army Commander and provincial governor of Hamgyeong fled without any resistance.

The Japanese met their first real resistance at Haejungchang, a warehouse near Gilju. The North Army Commander Han Gukham led an attack on the Japanese and forced them to take shelter in the warehouse. He then advanced on their position but was unable to take the fortified warehouse in the face of massed gunfire. They retreated into a nearby mountain cave where they would later be caught in an ambush by the Japanese that night. The Japanese fired on them and once they panicked, went in and cut them down. Han Guknam managed to escape only to be caught by Korean defectors who handed him over to the Japanese.

Katō marched further north and was received by Korean defectors who handed over the two Korean princes, Prince Imhae and Prince Sunhwa. Katō then crossed the Duman River with 8,000 troops and 3,000 Korean defectors into the territory of the Orangai Jurchens. He proceeded to take a relatively undefended fortress. The next day nearly 10,000 Jurchens attacked the Japanese but withdrew after a heavy downpour started blowing in their direction. Katō quickly retreated back across the Duman River and south to Anbyeon where he wrote back to Hideyoshi Toyotomi.

Citations

Bibliography

 
 
 
 
 
 
 
 
 
 
 桑田忠親 [Kuwata, Tadachika], ed., 舊參謀本部編纂, [Kyu Sanbo Honbu], 朝鮮の役 [Chousen no Eki]　(日本の戰史 [Nihon no Senshi] Vol. 5), 1965.
 
 
 
 
 
 
 
 
 
 
 
 
  
 
 
 
 
 
 

Battles of the Japanese invasions of Korea (1592–1598)
Jurchen history
Military history of Japan
1592 in Japan
Military history of Korea
1592 in Asia